Zavareh (also Romanized as Zavāreh, Zavâre, and Zavvāreh; also known as Īstgāh-ye Zavār and Zūrāvar) is a city and capital of Zavareh District, in Ardestan County, Isfahan Province, Iran. At the 2006 census, its population was 7,806, in 2,197 families.

Zavareh is located at the northeast of Isfahan Province, next to the central desert area. It is known that Zavareh had a Sassanian fire temple and was an important trade center in the Seljuk period. The town is named after Zavareh, the brother of Rostam, a mythical hero of Iran.

Historical sites
 Zavareh Grand Mosque: An inscription in the entrance stucco dates this Seljuk-era mosque to 1135–1136, making it the first known dated mosque constructed according to a four-portico (iwan) plan in the post-Islamic Iran.
 Pa Minar Mosque: The minaret of this mosque bears a Kufic inscription in brick, dating it to 1068–1069. This makes it the second oldest dated minaret in Iran, the oldest being at Saveh. The minaret makes part of a Seljuk mosque, which has been restored during the Il-Khanid period.
 Zavareh's Kariz Qanat: This Qanat dates back to 5000 year ago, is a network of underground canals which brings the water from distant water resources.

References

 Matheson, Sylvia A. (1972). Persia: An Archaeological Guide. London: Faber and Faber Limited.

External links

 The ancient desert township

Populated places in Ardestan County
Cities in Isfahan Province